The volcano Prestahnúkur is in the west of the Highlands of Iceland to the west of Langjökull glacier, or to be more specific, to the west of Geitlandsjökull glacier, a part of the Langjökull.

The volcanic system
The central volcano Prestahnúkur consists of rhyolite and has a small magma chamber. At its feet is a high temperature area which shows that the volcano is active. 

In 2009 some geologists of the Icelandic Meteorologic Institute researched the material about earthquake events in the area. This shows that volcanic fissures lie in direction southwest-northeast and reach among others under the glaciers Þórisjökull and Geitlandsjökull-Langjökull.

The rock
The rhyolite of the mountain was for some time very popular and exploited as construction material, partly for export. But the mine has been closed.

The name
The name means "peak of the priests".

The origin of the name was an expedition of two priests into the highlands in the 17th century. It was seen as quite an enterprise at the time when they went into this region. They explored especially a valley behind the Þórisjökull called Þórisdalur, which had a bad reputation in sagas and folk stories because it was believed to be haunted by ghosts and that lawless people would be living there. As is clear today, they found nothing of the sort, but they were regarded as heroes when they came back from this expedition.

Highland Road Kaldidalur and mountaineering 
The highland road Kaldidalur is situated not far from the mountain and it is possible to access the mountain by a bad jeep track and climb it.

See also
 Volcanism of Iceland
 List of mountains in Iceland

References

External links
 Prestahnúkur in the Catalogue of Icelandic Volcanoes
  Icelandic Meteorological Institute,  2009, Icelandic with English summary and maps
   Photo: with a jeep onto the mountain
 

Volcanoes of Iceland
Active volcanoes
West Volcanic Zone of Iceland
Borgarbyggð
Volcanic systems of Iceland